William Adolphus Knell (1801–1875) was a successful British maritime painter of the 19th century.

Life

Knell was born in 1801 at Carisbrooke on the Isle of Wight. By 1825 had already exhibited his works at the Royal Academy. He soon built up a successful practice as a painter of maritime and particularly naval subjects, exhibiting regularly at the Royal Academy, British Institution and the Society of British Artists. He was particularly praised in 1847 for The Battle off Cape St. Vincent, 14 February 1797, shown at Westminster Hall in 1847. It was purchased for the nation for £200 and is now part of the Parliamentary Art Collection. Reviewing Knell's Destruction of Toulon, shown in the same exhibition, The Athenæum said: "It is more conspicuous in chiaroscuro treatment than most of the pictures here of its class ... a little less whiteness in the more intense portions of the fire would have given greater brilliancy. The handling is as vigorous and sketchy as the effect is powerful.

Knell was twice commissioned by Queen Victoria for paintings. His picture The Arrival of Prince Albert, 6 February 1840  was bought by the prince himself  and remains in the Royal Collection.  It shows  the packet steamer Ariel, on board which Albert came to Britain for his wedding, approaching the crowded quay at Dover in a storm.

The returns of the 1861 Census record  the family as living in St Pancras, London.  William Adolphus, then aged 58 was married to Susan; his son William Calcott, aged 32 (b.c. 1829), was married to Maria and another son,  Adolphus (b.c. 1849) was aged 12. Both William Calcott Knell and Adolphus Knell also became successful painters.

He died on 9 July 1875 at his home in Kentish Town and was buried at Abney Park Cemetery.

Both WA Knell and Adolphus painted a significant number of small picture of boats at dusk and in the moonlight.  Many of these smaller pictures are on panel rather than on canvas which has the advantage that the harder surface allows for higher detail.

Notes

External links

 

1801 births
19th-century English painters
English male painters
1875 deaths
Burials at Abney Park Cemetery
19th-century English male artists